Mirco Poloni (born 18 September 1974 in Trescore Balneario) is an Italian former association footballer.

Poloni made his Serie A debut on 26 May 1991 against A.C. Torino, and is best known for having spent twelve consecutive seasons at AlbinoLeffe, plus one at AlbinoLeffe's predecessor Albinese Calcio, being one of the key players in the club's rise to the Serie B. He retired in June 2010, after more than 300 games with the Celeste, in order to become Emiliano Mondonico's technical assistant at the club.

Poloni capped for Italy U17 at 1991 FIFA U-17 World Championship.

External links
http://www.gazzetta.it/speciali/serie_b/2008_nw/giocatori/53036.shtml
http://www.albinoleffe.com/index.php?option=com_campionato&task=giocatore&giocatore=3222
National Stats aft FIGC 

Italian footballers
Italy youth international footballers
Atalanta B.C. players
U.S. Fiorenzuola 1922 S.S. players
U.S. Pergolettese 1932 players
U.C. AlbinoLeffe players
A.S.D. SolbiaSommese Calcio players
Virtus Bergamo Alzano Seriate 1909 players
Serie A players
Serie C players
Association football goalkeepers
Sportspeople from the Province of Bergamo
1974 births
Living people
Association football midfielders
Footballers from Lombardy